The 1973 Coupe de France Final was a football match held at Parc des Princes, Paris on 17 June 1973. It saw Olympique Lyonnais defeat FC Nantes 2–1, thanks to goals by Dobrivoje Trivić and Bernard Lacombe.

Match details

See also
Coupe de France 1972-73

External links
Coupe de France results at Rec.Sport.Soccer Statistics Foundation
Report on French federation site

Coupe
1973
Coupe De France Final 1973
Coupe De France Final 1973
Coupe de France Final
Coupe de France Final